Kathryn Pritchard (born 14 September 1972) is a British figure skater. She competed in the pairs event at the 1992 Winter Olympics.

References

External links
 

1972 births
Living people
British female pair skaters
Olympic figure skaters of Great Britain
Figure skaters at the 1992 Winter Olympics
Sportspeople from Scarborough, North Yorkshire